BP is a multinational oil and gas company headquartered in London.

BP, bp, and Bp may also refer to:

Business and organisations

Businesses
BP Canada, a division of the oil company BP
BP Studio, a Florentine fashion house
Air Botswana, IATA airline code BP
Boston Pizza, a Canadian-based restaurant chain

Political parties
Bavaria Party, a political party in Germany
Brexit Party, a eurosceptic political party in the UK
Farmers' Party (Netherlands), (in Dutch: Boerenpartij, BP), a defunct political party

Sports bodies
Baseball Prospectus, a statistical analysis organization
IF Brommapojkarna (BP), a Swedish football team

People 

Robert Baden-Powell, 1st Baron Baden-Powell (1857–1941), known as B-P, founder of The Boy Scouts Association 
Benny Parsons (1941–2007), nicknamed BP, NASCAR champion and commentator
BP Cooper, American screenwriter, film and commercial producer
BP Fallon (born 1946), Irish DJ and author
BP Koirala (1914–1982), former Prime Minister of Nepal
BP Valenzuela (born 1995), Filipino singer-songwriter

Places 
BP Pedestrian Bridge, in the Loop community area of Chicago, Illinois, U.S.
BP Structure, an impact crater in Libya
Bletchley Park, the central site for British codebreakers during World War II, known as B.P.
Solomon Islands, FIPS country code and NATO country code digram BP
Bp., a written abbreviation of Budapest

Science, technology and mathematics

Biology and medicine 
Base pair (bp), the building blocks of the DNA double helix
Binding potential, in pharmacokinetics and receptor-ligand kinetics
Blood pressure
British Pharmacopoeia

Chemicals
 Black powder, in pyrotechnics
 Boiling point
 Boron phosphide (BP), a semiconducting compound
 Biphenyl (BP), an organic compound

Computing and telecommunications 
Base pointer, in 16-bit x86 architecture
Baseband processor, a device in a network interface

Other uses in science, technology and mathematics 
Bp star, a stellar classification 
Before Present, a time scale used in geology and other scientific disciplines
 BP, in mathematics, the representing spectrum of the Brown–Peterson cohomology
BP, a variant of the Mazda B engine

Other uses 
Bohlen–Pierce scale, or B–P scale, a musical tuning and scale
⟨bp⟩, a Latin-script digraph
Basis point, one hundredth of a percent
British Parliamentary Style, a debate type
 BP (Broken Pekoe), a tea leaf grading
 BP, a house brand of US retailer Nordstrom for apparel
 BP, Before Present
 Best Picture

See also
BP holin family (BP-hol), a protein family
BP Portrait Award